Bad Reichenhall (Central Bavarian: Reichahoi) is a spa town, and administrative center of the Berchtesgadener Land district in Upper Bavaria, Germany. It is located near Salzburg in a basin encircled by the Chiemgau Alps (including Mount Staufen (1,771 m) and Mount Zwiesel (1,781 m)). 
Together with other alpine towns Bad Reichenhall engages in the Alpine Town of the Year Association for the implementation of the Alpine Convention to achieve sustainable development in the alpine arc. 
Bad Reichenhall was awarded Alpine Town of the Year in 2001.

Bad Reichenhall is a traditional center of salt production, obtained by evaporating water saturated with salt from brine ponds.

History
 The earliest known inhabitants of this area are the tribes of the Glockenbecher-Culture (a Bronze Age Culture, from about 2000 B.C.)
 In the age of the La Tene culture (about 450 B.C.) organised salt production commenced utilising the local brine pools. In the same period a Celtic place of worship is placed at the "Langacker".
 From 15 B.C to 480 A.D, the city is part of a Roman province, Noricum.
 1136 A.D bought the founding of a monastery St. Zeno.
 In 1617-1619, a wooden pipeline for brine exportation to Traunstein was built, with a length of 31 km, and more than 200 m in altitude difference.
 In 1834, two thirds of the city's buildings were destroyed by a major fire.
 The early 19th century saw the beginning of tourism, with Reichenhall becoming a famous health resort.
 From 1890, Reichenhall is now called "Bad Reichenhall".
 On 25 April 1945, the area was bombed by allied forces, 200 people were killed. The town centre with many hospitals and the train station was nearly totally destroyed, the barracks didn't suffer any damage. After World War II the area was under American military governance (1945–1948).
 After World War II, the Americans established a Displaced Persons camp in the town, where Holocaust survivors lived for several years before immigrating to other countries.  
 In 1947, Ben Gurion visited the DP camp, and saw the artworks created by Samuel Bak, one of the Holocaust survivors living at the camp.
 On 1 November 1999, 16-year-old Martin Peyerl shot at people in the streets from his bedroom window, killing three and wounding several others, among them  actor Günter Lamprecht. He finally committed suicide after fatally shooting his sister and the family cat.
 In 2001 Bad Reichenhall was named Alpine Town of the Year and a few years later became a member of Alpine Pearls.

Ice rink disaster

Fifteen people, twelve of them children, died in the collapse of the Bad Reichenhall Ice Rink on 2 January 2006. Thirty-four people were injured in the accident.

Notable people from Bad Reichenhall
Philipp Öttl (born 1996), World Super Bikes motorcycle racer for Team GoEleven
Anni Friesinger-Postma (born 1977), German speed skater (born in Bad Reichenhall, lived in Inzell ~10 km away and now lives in Salzburg)
Lore Frisch, well known German actress in the 1940s and 1950s. Moved from Traunstein to Bad Reichenhall in the mid-1930s and got her start in acting in Bad Reichenhall before becoming famous in Munich and Berlin.
Barbara Gruber, ski mountaineer
Regina Häusl, alpine skier (born in Bad Reichenhall, started for the Ski-Klub Bad Reichenhall, lives in Schneizlreuth since her birth)
Andreas Hinterstoisser (1914–1936), German mountaineer
Andreas Hofer (composer), composer (1629–1684)
Michael Neumayer, (* 1979), ski jumper
Georg Nickaes, (* 1971), ski mountaineer
Günther Rall (1918–2009), World War II Luftwaffe ace, postwar Luftwaffe general
Karl Ullrich (1910–1996), SS Oberführer
Johannes Frießner (1892–1971), World War II German Army general
Walter Grabmann (1905–1992), German World War II Luftwaffe General
Hans Söllner, (* 1955), singer-songwriter
Peter Schreyer, (* 1953), car designer
Franz Oberwinkler, (1939–2018), mycologist, expert on Heterobasidiomycetes
Walter F. Tichy, (* 1952), computer scientist, initial developer of the RCS revision control system

Gallery

References

External links

 City of Bad Reichenhall (in German)
 Bad Reichenhall Tourist Centre (in German)
 Alpine Pearls
 History Salt Mine (in German)
 Museum (in German)
 AlpHaus Immobilien (in German)
 Library (in German)

Spa towns in Germany
Displaced persons camps in the aftermath of World War II
Berchtesgadener Land